This is a list of North American rapid transit systems by ridership. These heavy rail or rapid transit systems are also known as metro or subway systems. This list of systems in North America does not include light rail, even when they are integrated with heavy rail. Daily and annual ridership figures are based on "average weekday unlinked passenger trips" (where transfers between lines are counted as two separate passenger "boardings" or "trips"), unless otherwise indicated (e.g., Mexico City and Monterrey, whose figures are the average for all days, not just weekdays). For metro systems in the United States (including Puerto Rico) and Canada, the annual ridership figures for 2019 and average weekday ridership figures for the Fourth Quarter (Q4) of 2019 come from the American Public Transportation Association's (APTA) ridership reports statistics, unless otherwise noted. Ridership figures for Mexico come from Banco de Información Económica's INEGI reports for the year 2014. Ridership figures for the Dominican Republic come from the Directorate of Operations Santo Domingo Metro report for the year 2013.


See also
 List of metro systems
 List of United States rapid transit systems by ridership
 List of Latin American rail transit systems by ridership
 List of tram and light rail transit systems
 List of North American light rail systems by ridership
 List of United States light rail systems by ridership
 List of suburban and commuter rail systems
 List of United States commuter rail systems by ridership

Notes

References

North American rapid transit systems by ridership
 
Rapid transit in Canada
Rapid transit in Mexico